Alagalla Kondagama is a village in Sri Lanka.

Demographics

See also
List of towns in Central Province, Sri Lanka

External links

References

Populated places in Kandy District